Box Hill Senior Secondary College (BHSSC) is a state-run co-educational senior secondary school located in Box Hill, Victoria, Australia. The senior school has a three-year curriculum, composed of years ten - twelve. Year 9 are offered at the Middle Years Sports Campus.

Box Hill Senior Secondary College has no feeder schools, new students are welcomed from all over Melbourne, but are only selected after interview.

Box Hill Senior Secondary College is also the location of the Middle Years Sports Campus, which was established in 2005. The Middle Years Sports Campus also includes an AFL football academy for Year 9 students. Students of the Middle Years Sports Campus have access to all Box Hill Senior Secondary College's facilities to help them learn.

History 
The College began operating as Box Hill Senior Secondary College in 1993. It was formerly Box Hill Technical School, a boys school founded in 1942 and first became coeducational in 1984 when it merged with the Whitehorse Girls Technical School.

School uniform 
Despite being a government school, uniform is not compulsory in Years 10 - 12 at Box Hill Senior Secondary College. However, a sports uniform is compulsory for students in Years 7 - 9 attending the Middle Years Sport School.

Facilities and subjects 
Students are able to integrate their chosen sport specialty with a wide range of academic pursuits. The College offers traditional academic studies in VCE, alongside VCAL and VET studies, including pre-apprenticeship courses.  Facilities at Box Hill Senior Secondary College include technology (Building and Electrical pre - apprenticeships, Plumbing and Horticulture), design, art, photography, music recording and multimedia centres and facilities, a commercial kitchen, a basketball stadium, indoor training facility for Netball and 9 tennis courts.

Notable alumni
360 - Hip-hop artist
Maddy Brancatisano - AFLW player
Deng Deng - basketball player
Luke Kendall - basketball coach and former player
Emmanuel Malou - basketball player
Rob Mills - entertainer
Rebecca Ott - basketballer and AFLW player
Mick Parker - mountaineer
Ben Simmons - NBA Player
Adrien Sturt - basketball player
Jordan Vandenberg - NBA player
Robbie Gray-AFL 
Taylin Duman-
Tilly Lucas-Rodd -AFLW player 
Matthew Bate-AFL Footballer
James Parsons-AFL Footballer
Nick Malceski-AFL Footballer

References 

Public high schools in Victoria (Australia)
Buildings and structures in the City of Whitehorse
Secondary schools in Melbourne
Educational institutions established in 1993
1993 establishments in Australia